David Earl Garrison (born June 30, 1952) is an American actor.  His primary venue is live theatre, but he is best known as the character Steve Rhoades in the television series, Married... with Children. He has also appeared in numerous theatrical roles, particularly that of The Wizard on both Broadway and in many tours of the musical Wicked.

Early life
Garrison was born in Long Branch, New Jersey, the son of Earl B. Garrison, a school administrator and Maude B. Garrison, a teacher.

Garrison graduated from Freehold High School in 1970, where he began his acting career on the school's stage. He was inducted in the school's Hall of Fame in 2007. Garrison graduated summa cum laude from Boston University's College of Fine Arts in 1974. Following graduation, he became a member of the resident company at Arena Stage in Washington, D.C. for several years.

Career
Although he is known for his television roles and continues to appear frequently in guest-starring roles on television today, Garrison is primarily a theatre actor, particularly in musicals. He has appeared in numerous productions around the United States, including many Broadway shows. His Broadway appearances include A Day in Hollywood / A Night in the Ukraine for which he received a Tony Award nomination, Wicked, The Visit, Titanic, Torch Song Trilogy, The Pirates of Penzance, Bells Are Ringing, A History of the American Film, and The Great Society. His Off-Broadway credits include I Do! I Do!, for which he received a Drama Desk Award nomination, Dead Poets Society, Middletown, New Jerusalem, Geniuses, It’s Only a Play, By the Way Meet Vera Stark, The Cradle Will Rock, and Silence! The Musical. In addition to the cast albums of Hollywood/Ukraine, Titanic, Bells Are Ringing, The Visit, I Do! I Do!, and On the Town, his many recordings include Songs of New York, Show Boat, Kiss Me Kate, Annie Get Your Gun, Of Thee I Sing/Let ’Em Eat Cake, Girl Crazy, You Never Know, Tell Me More, Oh! Lady! Lady!!, George and Ira Standards and Gems, and, as a guest artist, Dawn Upshaw Sings Rodgers and Hart.”.

On tour, Garrison played Nathan Detroit in Guys and Dolls, and the Wizard in Wicked, for which he received a Carbonell Award. In regional theatre, he has played the Devil in Randy Newman's Faust (La Jolla/Goodman), Henry Carr in Travesties (Williamstown), Frosch in Die Fledermaus (Santa Fe Opera), Pangloss in Candide (Glimmerglass), Gaston in You Never Know (Pasadena Playhouse), Fagin in Oliver (Paper Mill Playhouse), Leonardo da Vinci in Ever After (Alliance Theatre), and Charley in the Arena Stage revival of Merrily We Roll Along for which he received a Helen Hayes Award. In London, he starred with Tyne Daly, Frederica Von Stade, Kurt Ollmann, and Thomas Hampson in a concert presentation of On the Town, which was broadcast on Great Performances for PBS.

Garrison has also appeared in numerous roles on television. In 1984–85, he starred as Norman Lamb on the sitcom It's Your Move, opposite Jason Bateman. In 1987, Garrison landed his best-known role, portraying Steve Rhoades, next-door neighbor to the Bundy family on the popular sitcom Married... with Children.

Garrison enjoyed his years playing Steve Rhoades, but he missed performing in live theatre, and left the show after four seasons. He was a regular on an NBC sitcom, Working It Out, shortly after his exit from Married... with Children. Nonetheless, Garrison parted on good terms, returning four times in subsequent seasons (and the reunion special) detailing the career Rhoades had pursued since he'd last been seen. He even parodied his own role on the show Nikki.

Other television credits include Unbreakable Kimmy Schmidt, Madam Secretary, The West Wing, 30 Rock, Law & Order, The Practice, Without a Trace, Everybody Loves Raymond, NYPD Blue, Judging Amy, Murphy Brown, Murder, She Wrote, L.A. Law, Tom Clancy's Op-Center, The Good Wife and, for PBS Great Performances, On the Town with the London Symphony Orchestra and Ira Gershwin at 100: A Celebration at Carnegie Hall. Garrison also participated in several installments of Pyramid as a celebrity guest, most notably helping a contestant win $100,000 during a Tournament episode of 
The $100,000 Pyramid in 1988 .

Wicked
He originated the role of The Wizard in the original touring company of Wicked when it began on March 8, 2005. He finished his year-long run on March 6, 2006. He then starred as the Wizard in the Broadway company from April 4, 2006 replacing Ben Vereen. After 15 months in the role he played his final performance on July 8, 2007. Then he temporarily starred in the Chicago company from September 30–October 28, 2007, and then starred in the Los Angeles company beginning August 26, 2008, until its closure on January 11, 2009. He played the role in the San Francisco production, which officially opened on February 6, 2009 and played his final performance with the production on May 31, 2009 in order to pursue a role in a new play.

Credits

Television 

 Working It Out—series regular (1990)
 Married.. with Children—series regular / guest (1987–1990, 1992, 1993, 1995)
 It's Your Move —series regular (1984-1985)
 Unbreakable Kimmy Schmidt (2017)
 Madam Secretary (2016)
 30 Rock (2013)
 The Good Wife (2013)
 The West Wing (2005)
 NYPD Blue (2005)
 Without a Trace (2004)
 Everybody Loves Raymond (2004)
 The Practice (2001, 2003)
 Ed (2001)
 Judging Amy (2001)
 Law & Order (1996, 1998, 2000, 2009)
 Ira Gershwin at 100—A Celebration at Carnegie Hall (1997)
 Tom Clancy’s Op Center (1995)
 Murder, She Wrote (1995)
 Murphy Brown (1995)
 On the Town—PBS Great Performances (1993)
 L.A. Law (1992)
 Remington Steele (1984)
 The Edge of Night-Cody Patrick (1978-1979)
 Sabrina, the Teenage Witch (1996 TV series) (2000)

Stage 
 The Great Society (2019)
Working (Encores! 2019)
The Cradle Will Rock (2019)
Ever After (2019)
Coming Back Like a Song (2018)
The Will Rogers Follies (2018)
Kid Victory (2017)
 Dead Poets Society (2016)
 Candide (2015)
 The Visit (2015)
 Oliver! (2013)
Romeo and Juliet (2013)
The Tale of the Allergist's Wife (2013)
 Silence! The Musical (2011)
 By the Way, Meet Vera Stark (2011)
Olive and the Bitter Herbs (2011)
 Middletown (2010)
 Red Remembers (2009)
 New Jerusalem (2008)
 Wicked (2005) (2007) (2008) (2009)
Singing Forest (2004)
 Travesties (2003)
 Twelfth Night (2002)
 Bells Are Ringing (2001)
 The Torch-Bearers (2000)
Over and Over (1999)
Strike Up the Band (Encores! 1998)
 Titanic (1997)
 I Do! I Do! (1996)
 Randy Newman’s Faust (1995) (1996)
Guys and Dolls (1993)
You Never Know (1990)
Merrily We Roll Along (1990)
 Die Fledermaus (1986)
 It’s Only a Play (1986)
 Torch Song Trilogy (1983)
 Geniuses (1982)
 Snoopy! The Musical (1982)
 The Pirates of Penzance (1982)
 A Day in Hollywood/A Night in the Ukraine (1980)
 A History of the American Film (1978)

Discography 
 The Visit (original cast album, Broadway Records, 2015)
Poetic License: 100 Poems 100 Performers (GPR, 2010)
Bells Are Ringing (original revival cast album, Verese Sarabande, 2001)
You Never Know (original revival cast album, Ghostlight, 2001)
Tell Me More (studio recording, Rob Fisher, New World, 2001)
Titanic (original cast album, RCA, 1997)
George and Ira Gershwin Standards and Gems (Nonesuch, 1996)
Dawn Upshaw Sings Rodgers and Hart (Nonesuch, 1996)
I Do! I Do! (original revival cast album, Varese Sarabande, 1996)
On the Town (concert recording, Michael Tilson Thomas, London Symphony, Deutsche Grammophon, 1993)
Annie Get Your Gun (studio recording, John McGlinn, EMI, 1991)
Kiss Me, Kate (studio recording, John McGlinn, EMI, 1991)
Girl Crazy (studio recording, John Mauceri, Roxbury, 1990)
Showboat (studio recording, John McGlinn, EMI, 1988)
Of Thee I Sing/Let ‘Em Eat Cake (concert recording, Michael Tilson Thomas, CBS, 1987)
Oh, Lady! Lady!! (studio recording, John McGlinn, 1985)
Songs of New York (John McGlinn, Book of the Month Club Records, 1984)
A Day in Hollywood/A Night in the Ukraine (original cast album, DRG, 1980)

Awards

References

External links
 
 
 
 

1952 births
Living people
20th-century American male actors
21st-century American male actors
American male musical theatre actors
American male television actors
Boston University College of Fine Arts alumni
Freehold High School alumni
Male actors from New Jersey
People from Long Branch, New Jersey